Committed is a 1991 American thriller drama film directed by William A. Levey and starring Jennifer O'Neill.  It is based on Susan Claudia’s novel Clock and Bell.

Cast
Jennifer O'Neill as Susan Manning
Robert Forster as Dr. Desmond Moore
William Windom as Dr. Magnus Quilly
Ron Palillo as Ronnie
Sydney Lassick as Gow

References

External links
 
 

American thriller drama films
Films based on American novels
1990s English-language films
1990s American films